Baeonoma leucophaeella is a moth in the family Depressariidae. It was described by Francis Walker in 1864. It is found in Pará, Brazil.

Adults are silvery white and rather stout, with the underside of the forewings aeneous (bronze) black.

References

Moths described in 1864
Baeonoma